The COSAFA Cup or COSAFA Senior Challenge Cup is an annual tournament for teams from Southern Africa organized by Council of Southern Africa Football Associations (COSAFA), inaugurated after the ban against the Republic of South Africa had been lifted and the African Cup of Nations had been staged there in 1996.

History
The following teams have participated in the tournament in the past: Angola, Botswana, Comoros, Eswatini (Swaziland), Lesotho, Madagascar, Malawi, Mauritius, Mozambique, Namibia, Seychelles, South Africa, Zambia, and Zimbabwe. Additionally, seven non-COSAFA members have competed: Democratic Republic of the Congo, Equatorial Guinea, Ghana, Kenya, Tanzania, Uganda and Senegal. Zimbabwe and Zambia have won the most titles with six wins, followed by South Africa with five wins. Zambia has been the most prolific side in the competition failing to reach the top 4 only four times since the tournament's inception. The first editions of the competition were a knockout tournament staged over several months. As the competition grew, it transformed into a series of mini-tournaments.

The 2010 COSAFA Senior Challenge was to be the 14th edition of the football tournament that involves teams from Southern Africa. In July 2010 it was confirmed that Angola would host the competition.  The 2010 edition of the competition was cancelled in October, 2010. COSAFA stated that the Angolan authorities did not give enough guarantees to host the tournament.

Results

 A round-robin tournament determined the final standings.

Teams reaching the top four

Participating nations
Legend

 – Champions
 – Runners-up
 – Third place
 – Fourth place
5th – Fifth place

 – Semi-finals
QF – Quarter-finals
GS – Group stage
1R – First round
2R – Second round

 — Hosts
 –  – Did not enter
 ––  – Withdrew before qualification / Banned

*D.R. Congo, Equatorial Guinea, Ghana, Kenya, Tanzania, Uganda and Senegal are not COSAFA members, but have been invited to participate in the past.
1 Withdrew from tournament.
2 Tournament not played.

Summary
All stats correct as of the 2022 COSAFA Cup. COSAFA Cup invitees are not included in the table.

Notes

Top scorers
Peter Ndlovu of Zimbabwe and  Manuel 'Tico-Tico' Bucuane of Mozambique are all-time top goalscorers in the tournament with ten goals each. In 2021 Felix Badenhorst of Eswatini moved into second position with nine goals.

See also
COSAFA Women's Championship
COSAFA U-20 Challenge Cup
COSAFA U-17 Challenge Cup

References
 Kabelo

External links
Official site
COSAFA Cup at RSSSF

 
COSAFA competitions